The 1904 Louisiana Industrial football team was an American football team that represented the Louisiana Industrial Institute—now known as Louisiana Tech University—as an independent during the 1904 college football season. In their first and only season under head coach E. G. Pierce, Louisiana Industrial compiled a 1–3 record. The team's captain was Glenn M. Walker.

Schedule

References

Louisiana Industrial
Louisiana Tech Bulldogs football seasons
Louisiana Industrial football